Watisone Lotawa is a New Zealand Rugby Union player who plays provincial rugby for Auckland in the Air New Zealand Cup

Early career
Watisone Lotawa played for North Otago in the 3rd Division of the NPC, he was a member of the North Otago squad that won the 2002 3rd Division final against Horowhenua-Kapiti. After a couple of seasons for North Otago he took up a contract with Southland. He played 33 games for Southland and it was with them he played his first match in the Air New Zealand Cup.

Auckland
Watisone Lotawa now plays in Auckland for clubside Suburbs, and he has been named in the 2008 Auckland side for the Air New Zealand Cup.

References
Auckland Player Profile

1979 births
Living people
Fijian expatriate rugby union players
Fijian rugby union players
North Otago rugby union players
Expatriate rugby union players in New Zealand
Fijian expatriate sportspeople in New Zealand
I-Taukei Fijian people
Rugby union fullbacks
Rugby union wings